New York's 55th State Assembly district is one of the 150 districts in the New York State Assembly. It has been represented by Latrice Walker since 2015.

Geography
District 55 is in Brooklyn, encompassing portions of Brownsville and Ocean Hill.

Recent election results

2022

2020

2018

2016

2014

2012

2010

2008

References

55
Politics of Brooklyn